National Highway 165 (NH 165), PP Road is a National Highway in the Indian state of Andhra Pradesh. It starts at Pamarru and terminates at Digamarru (Palakollu) road.

See also 
 List of National Highways in Andhra Pradesh

References 

National highways in India